The fourth season of The Masked Singer Australia was announced in October 2021 and premiered on Network 10 on 7 August 2022. In the Grand Finale on 28 August 2022, The winner was revealed to be Melody Thornton as “Mirrorball”, the runner-up was Sheldon Riley as “Snapdragon”, and third place was Hugh Sheridan as “Rooster”.

The fourth series was filmed with a live audience between 30 June and 20 July 2022.

Production
The costumes were designed and created by Australian Academy Award and BAFTA Award-Winning costume designer Tim Chappel.

Panelists and host
Only comedian Dave Hughes remained on the panel after the show's previous panelists left. British singer-songwriter Mel B, TV personality Abbie Chatfield and radio personality Chrissie Swan joined Hughes as panelists. Osher Günsberg returned as host.

Contestants
Before the season began, Network Ten revealed that the cast included a Grammy Award winner, a gold medalist, a singer with more than 50 million records sold and a multiple Logie Award winner.

This is the first season to feature "Wild Card" contestants. Further explained in the premiere episode, it was revealed that two of the twelve contestants would perform later in the competition, similar to the format of the fifth American season.

Like the previous season, a special guest mask, "Poodle", appeared for one night. Poodle was revealed to be Tori Spelling, who also appeared as Unicorn on the first American season.

(WC) This masked singer is a wildcard contestant.

Episodes

Episode 1 (7 August)

Episode 2 (8 August)

Episode 3 (9 August)

Episode 4 (14 August)

Episode 5 (15 August)
Group number: "Absolutely Everybody" by Vanessa Amorosi

Episode 6 (16 August)
Group Number: "Love Is In The Air" by John Paul Young

Episode 7 (21 August)

Episode 8 (22 August)

Episode 9 (23 August) 
Group Number: "Best Day of My Life" by American Authors

Episode 10 (24 August)

Episode 11 (28 August) - Finale 
Group number: "Firework" by Katy Perry

Reception

Ratings

References

External links
 
 
 

The Masked Singer (Australian TV series)
2022 Australian television seasons